Baldy or Baldie is a nickname for:

 Brian Baldinger (born 1959), American football player and broadcaster
 Mark Baldwin (baseball) (1863–1929), American professional baseball player
 Fred Brown (ice hockey) (1900–1970), Canadian National Hockey League player
 Dominick Canterino (died 1990), American mobster convicted for racketeering, nicknamed "Baldy Dom"
 Baldwin Cooke (1888–1953), American comedic actor, also known as "Baldy Cooke"
 Harold Cotton (ice hockey) (1902–1984), Canadian National Hockey League player
 Wayne Fox (born 1959), former Australian rules footballer 
 F. A. Harper (1905–1973), American academic, economist and writer
 Arthur Hezlet (1914–2007), Royal Navy vice-admiral
 Henry Jones (pitcher), American Major League Baseball pitcher in 1890
 Benn Karr (1893–1968), American Major League Baseball pitcher
 Alan Longo (born 1950), alleged Brooklyn mobster convicted of racketeering, nicknamed "Baldie"
 Bill Louden (1883–1935), American Major League Baseball player
 Calum MacKay (ice hockey) (1927–2001), Canadian National Hockey League player
 Baldy Northcott (1908–1986), Canadian National Hockey League player
 Eddie Palmer (baseball) (1893–1983), American Major League Baseball player in 1917
 Charles Alan Pownall (1887–1975), US Navy rear admiral and Governor of Guam
 Baldy Jack Rose (1987–1947), American gambler and mobster in New York City born Jacob Rosenzweig
 Ed Silch (1865–1895),  American Major League Baseball player in the 1888 season
 William Farrar Smith (1824–1903), Union general in the American Civil War
 Vince Sherlock (1910–1997), American Major League Baseball player in 1935
 Charles Spittal (1874–1971), Canadian hockey player, one of the first to play professionally
 Blaine Thomas (1888–1915), American Major League Baseball pitcher
 Dave Tomlinson (Canadian football) (c. 1926–in or after 1998), Canadian Football League player
 Baldy Wittman (c. 1871–?), professional football player in the Ohio League (1903–1911)

See also 

Ramón Díaz (born 1959), Argentine former footballer and coach nicknamed El Pelado ("Baldy")
List of people known as the Bald

Lists of people by nickname